Swallow Bay is a bay within Boulder Basin in Lake Mead in Clark County, Nevada.

References

Bays of Nevada
Lake Mead